O'Hare is the Anglicized form of the Irish name Ó hÍr. This is a famous Irish clan (or sept) surname.

The earliest reference to the clan O haichir (now O'Hare) is to be found in the Annals of The Four Masters. The great majority of O'Hares' were descendants of the Oriel family of Ohir or Oheir, who were kin to the O'Hanlons and seated in the Barony of Orier, County Armagh, where, with the adjacent counties of Antrim and Down, the O'Hares are still found. The O'Hare name was spelled: O'Heir, O'Hire, O'Heere, O'Hear, O'Hare and O'Haire. It is the name of an Oriel family who were chiefs of Oirtheara, now the baronies of Orier, in the east of County Armagh. According to the traditional Irish pedigree, the family is descended from Slioch Ir, who was the son of Ior and the grandson of Cathal Ruadh, who was killed in 1401.

O'Hare is one of the few surnames which resisted the general tendency in the 18th century to discard the 'O' in their name. Generally, the distinctive mark of an Irish surname is "Mac" or "O", according to the well-known lines: Per Mac atque O, tu veros cognoscis Hibernos; His duobus demptis, nullus Hibernus wades; which have been translated:

By Mac and O
You'll always know
True Irishmen, they say;
But if they lack
Both O and Mac,
No Irishmen are they.

Down from the Anglo-Norman invasion, the names in use in Ireland were almost purely Gaelic; however, the English forced the Irish to adopt English surnames. Accordingly, it was enacted by the statute of Edward IV (1465), that every Irishman dwelling within the Pale, which then comprised the counties of Dublin, Meath, Louth and Kildare, should take an English surname. The Irish people were forced into adopting an English surname, or at least an English version of their Irish surname, therefore many removed the 'Mac' or 'O' from their surname.  However The O'Hehir and O'Hare families did not drop the 'O', nor did they adopt an English version of their surnames. As a result, they would have had to endure extreme hardship and suffering because of such opposition. (The creation of societies such as the Gaelic League in the late 19th century resulted in the widespread resumption of the 'Mac' and 'O' prefixes to many Irish surnames.)

People with the surname O'Hare

 Brendan O'Hare, Scottish musician
 Damian O'Hare,  Irish actor
 David O'Hare, Irish tennis player
 Davy O'Hare, Irish footballer
 Denis O'Hare, American actor 
 Dessie O'Hare, Irish republican paramilitary fighter
 Edward O'Hare, U.S. Navy pilot
 Edward J. O'Hare, American lawyer 
 Hefin O'Hare, Irish rugby union player
 James Haldane O'Hare, Scottish Theatrical scenic and costume designer.
 John O'Hare, Australian actor, director, teacher
 John O'Hare, Scottish footballer
 Joseph A. O'Hare, Jesuit priest
 Kate Richards O'Hare, American activist
 Kevin O'Hare, ballet dancer, the Royal Ballet director from 2012
 Mark O'Hare, Cartoonist
 Michael O'Hare, American actor
 Rita O'Hare, General Secretary of Sinn Féin
 Turlough O'Hare, Canadian swimmer
 William F. O'Hare, American Catholic bishop

Fictional Characters
Aloysius O'Hare, the main antagonist from the animated film The Lorax
Tulip O'Hare, fictional character from the comic book series Preacher

See also
 O'Hara
 O'Hair
 Hare (surname)

Surnames of Irish origin
Irish families
Lists of people by surname